Njabulo Ngcobo (born 27 May 1994) is a South African professional soccer player. He is a defender for South African club Kaizer Chiefs and the South African national team. Ngcobo was named the PSL Defender of the Season in 2021.

Club career 
Ngcobo first started playing for Flamingo fc in uMzumbe SAFA Ugu Region, as a Midfielder he left there for left there for Amazulu Academy after Matric

Ngcobo is a youth product of the academy of AmaZulu, having made his senior debut in 2016 before he was loaned to Richards Bay. Njabulo joined Moroka Swallows in the 2020–21 season, where he made 28 appearances.

On 4 July 2021, Ngcobo signed a three-year contract with Kaizer Chiefs.

International career
He made his debut for South Africa national soccer team on 13 July 2021 in a 2021 COSAFA Cup game against Lesotho. South Africa won the tournament, and Ngcobo score a goal in a semifinal victory over Mozambique.

References

External links 
 

1994 births
Living people
South African soccer players
South Africa international soccer players
Association football defenders
AmaZulu F.C. players
Richards Bay F.C. players
Uthongathi F.C. players
Moroka Swallows F.C. players
Kaizer Chiefs F.C. players
National First Division players
South African Premier Division players